Kazirbag Eco-Park is an eco-park and recreation center located at Kazirbag, just  away from Feni city in Bangladesh.

History
It was located within  of land. Contraction was started in December 2015 and was completed in June 2018. The park was opened in December 2015. The park located in a green valley with trees and captive wild animals like monkeys and deer, and birds like peacocks.

References

Parks in Bangladesh